Paul Blart: Mall Cop 2 is a 2015 American action comedy film directed by Andy Fickman and written by Kevin James and Nick Bakay. It is the sequel to 2009's , and stars James in the title role, Raini Rodriguez, and Shirley Knight.

Filming began in April 2014 at the Wynn Las Vegas casino resort. It was released the following year on April 17, 2015. Paul Blart: Mall Cop 2 was the first film shot on the Steve Wynn property. It was also the first film to receive Nevada's film tax credit, enacted in 2013, netting the production a $4.3 million return on expenditures. The film was panned by critics and grossed $108 million worldwide at the box office.

Plot
Following the events at West Orange Pavilion Mall, Paul Blart is recovering from several misfortunes. His wife Amy divorced him six days into their marriage, and two years later, his mother Margaret was killed after being hit by a milk truck. To feel better, Paul takes pride in patrolling the mall. He receives an invitation to a security officers' convention in Las Vegas and begins to believe his luck is about to change. His daughter, Maya, discovers that she was accepted into UCLA and plans to move across the country to Los Angeles, but in light of her father's invitation, she decides to withhold the information for now.

After arriving in Las Vegas, Paul and his daughter meet the general manager of Wynn Las Vegas, a pretty young woman named Divina Martinez, whom Paul is instantly attracted to. He later learns that she's dating the hotel's head of security, Eduardo Furtillo. Meanwhile, Maya falls in love with the hotel's valet, Lane. A security guard from the Mall of America attending the convention, Donna Ericone, is aware of Paul's earlier heroics in the West Orange Pavilion Mall incident and believes Paul will be the likely keynote speaker at the event. However, Paul discovers that another security guard, Nick Panero, is giving the speech.

In the midst of the convention, a criminal named Vincent Sofel and a gang of accomplices disguised as hotel employees are secretly plotting to steal priceless works of art from the hotel and replace them with replicas, then sell the real ones at auction. In the meantime, Paul has become overprotective of Maya after discovering her flirting with Lane and spies on their conversations. He is later mocked by Eduardo for his lack of professionalism in an event where hotel security was notified when Maya turns up missing. In an ensuing argument with her father, Maya becomes angry and claims she's attending UCLA despite Paul's wishes that she remain close to home at a junior college.

At the convention, Paul, Donna, and three other security guards, Saul Gundermutt, Khan Mubi, and Gino Chizetti check out the non-lethal security equipment on display. Later, Paul takes a break in The Garden Of Contemplation, only to face off against a bird while a man playing piano watches. Paul finds Nick drunkenly hitting on a woman at the bar. Paul attempts to defuse the situation and Nick passes out, giving Paul a chance to be the event's speaker. Following the speech, Paul learns about Maya and Lane's situation and rushes to help but abruptly collapses due to his hypoglycemia that has plagued him for years.

After recovering, Paul is able to take down several of Vincent's thugs and gathers intel on the group's intentions. Using non-lethal equipment from the convention, he is able to take out more of Vincent's crew. Meanwhile, Maya and Lane overhear Vincent adamantly refusing an oatmeal cookie due to a severe oatmeal allergy, leading to said cookie being thrown from a window. Working with a team – Donna, Saul, Khan, and Gino – Paul is able to clumsily dismantle Vincent's operation, with Maya severely incapacitating Vincent by rubbing oatmeal-infused concealer on his face and Paul finishing Vincent off with an extremely forceful headbutt. Afterward, Paul convinces Divina to be with Eduardo. He also accepts Maya going to UCLA, funding her tuition with the reward he obtained from Steve Wynn for stopping Vincent. After dropping off Maya at UCLA, Paul falls for a mounted police officer who reciprocates his advances, but her horse reflexively kicks him into the side of a car.

Cast

Jayma Mays was only seen in the opening because she couldn't reprise the role for the sequel.

Production

Development
In January 2009, Sony expressed an interest in making a sequel to Paul Blart: Mall Cop. It was revealed on January 7, 2014,  that Andy Fickman was in talks to direct the film while Kevin James, who also co-wrote the script with Nick Bakay, would be back to star as Blart. James produced the film along with Todd Garner and Happy Madison's Adam Sandler. The cast includes David Henrie, Raini Rodriguez, Eduardo Verástegui, Nicholas Turturro, Gary Valentine, Neal McDonough, Daniella Alonso, and D. B. Woodside, starring alongside James.

On March 14, 2014, the Nevada Film Office announced that Sony Pictures had been awarded the first certificate of eligibility for a new tax credit enacted in 2013, in regard to the filming of Paul Blart: Mall Cop 2. Nevada Film Office Director, Eric Preiss, indicated that the production would get $4.3 million in tax credits based on the proposal in their application. The film was initially greenlit with a $45–50 million production budget, but after Kevin James agreed to take a paycut the final figure came in at around $38 million. On April 2, 2014, Columbia Pictures announced that the film would be released on April 17, 2015.

Filming

In an October 2012 interview, James said that he liked the idea of filming the sequel at the Mall of America. Principal photography commenced on April 21, 2014, at Wynn Las Vegas, and ended on June 26, 2014. It is the first time that Steve Wynn has allowed a commercial film to be shot at this property. For the only scene involving the West Orange Pavilion Mall (shown at the beginning of the film), the only exterior shot of the mall is deleted stock footage of the Burlington Mall taken from the first film, while all interior shots were filmed in Fashion Show Mall in Las Vegas.

Release
Paul Blart: Mall Cop 2 was released by Columbia Pictures in the United States on April 17, 2015. It was released on DVD and Blu-ray on July 14, 2015.

Reception

Box office 
Paul Blart: Mall Cop 2 grossed $71 million in North America and $36.5 million in other territories for a worldwide total of $107.5 million, against a production budget of $38 million.

In its opening weekend, the film grossed $23.8 million, finishing second at the box office behind Furious 7 ($29.2 million).

Critical response 
On Rotten Tomatoes, the film has a rating of 6% based on 63 reviews and an average rating of 3.00/10. The website's critics consensus reads, "Bathed in flop sweat and bereft of purpose, Paul Blart: Mall Cop 2 strings together fat-shaming humor and Segway sight gags with uniformly unfunny results." On Metacritic, the film has a weighted average score of 13 out of 100, based on 16 critics, indicating "overwhelming dislike". Audiences polled by CinemaScore gave the film an average grade of "B−" on an A+ to F scale.

Sara Stewart of the New York Post gave the film one out of four stars and wrote that the plot is "just an excuse for James to do his one trick over and over: Bluster, then screw up humiliatingly". Frank Scheck of The Hollywood Reporter wrote, "James tries hard, very hard, to inject the proceedings with slapstick humor, propelling his large body through endless physical contortions in a fruitless effort for laughs." Justin Chang of Variety called it a "tacky, numbingly inane sequel".

In rating the film zero stars, Christy Lemire of RogerEbert.com wrote, "Truly, there is not a single redeeming moment in director Andy Fickman's film. A general flatness and lethargy permeate these reheated proceedings." Kevin P. Sullivan of Entertainment Weekly gave the film a D and called it "far from the worst movie that you'll ever see", though he wondered why people would bother watching it. Peter Howell of the Toronto Star gave the film a half a star out of four, saying: "Caddyshack 2. Exorcist 2. Speed 2. To this small sample of the ever-expanding list of wretched movie sequels, add Paul Blart: Mall Cop 2, a gobsmackingly witless excuse for entertainment." Andy Webster of The New York Times described the film as inoffensive but familiar.

Legacy 
In 2015, Tim Batt and Guy Montgomery (hosts of The Worst Idea of All Time) formed a podcast called 'Til Death Do Us Blart with Justin McElroy, Travis McElroy, and Griffin McElroy (hosts of My Brother, My Brother and Me) to review Paul Blart: Mall Cop 2 every Thanksgiving for the rest of their lives.

Accolades

Possible sequel 
In January 2022, James hinted at the possibility of a third film, stating:

See also
 List of films set in Las Vegas

References

External links
 
 
 

2015 action comedy films
2015 films
American action comedy films
American sequel films
Columbia Pictures films
2010s English-language films
Films about dysfunctional families
Films about security and surveillance
Films directed by Andy Fickman
Films produced by Adam Sandler
Films scored by Rupert Gregson-Williams
Films set in shopping malls
Films set in the Las Vegas Valley
Films shot in the Las Vegas Valley
Films with screenplays by Kevin James
Happy Madison Productions films
2010s American films